The men's team épée was one of eight fencing events on the fencing at the 1968 Summer Olympics programme. It was the thirteenth appearance of the event. The competition was held from 24 to 25 October 1968. 91 fencers from 20 nations competed. For the first time in 60 years, Italy failed to finish in the top three positions.

Rosters

Argentina
 Guillermo Saucedo
 Alberto Balestrini
 Guillermo Obeid
 Omar Vergara

Australia
 Russell Hobby
 Peter Macken
 Graeme Jennings
 Bill Ronald
 Duncan Page

Austria
 Udo Birnbaum
 Roland Losert
 Herbert Polzhuber
 Frank Battig

Brazil
 Arthur Ribeiro
 Darío Amaral
 José Maria Pereira
 Carlos Couto

Canada
 Peter Bakonyi
 John Andru
 Magdy Conyd
 Gerry Wiedel

Cuba
 Orlando Ruíz
 Gustavo Oliveros
 Manuel González
 José Antonio Díaz

East Germany
 Bernd Uhlig
 Klaus Dumke
 Harry Fiedler
 Hans-Peter Schulze

France
 François Jeanne
 Claude Bourquard
 Yves Boissier
 Jacques La Degaillerie
 Jean-Pierre Allemand

Great Britain
 Nick Halsted
 Teddy Bourne
 Bill Hoskyns
 Ralph Johnson
 Peter Jacobs

Hungary
 Zoltán Nemere
 Győző Kulcsár
 Pál B. Nagy
 Csaba Fenyvesi
 Pál Schmitt

Ireland
 John Bouchier-Hayes
 Fionbarr Farrell
 Michael Ryan
 Colm O'Brien

Italy
 Gianfranco Paolucci
 Claudio Francesconi
 Giovanni Battista Breda
 Gianluigi Saccaro
 Antonio Albanese

Mexico
 Carlos Calderón
 Valeriano Pérez
 Jorge Castillejos
 Ernesto Fernández

Poland
 Bohdan Andrzejewski
 Michał Butkiewicz
 Bogdan Gonsior
 Henryk Nielaba
 Kazimierz Barburski

Portugal
 Hélder Reis
 José Pinheiro
 João de Abreu
 Francisco da Silva

Soviet Union
 Grigory Kriss
 Viktor Modzolevsky
 Iosif Vitebsky
 Aleksey Nikanchikov
 Yury Smolyakov

Sweden
 Dicki Sörensen
 Orvar Lindwall
 Carl von Essen
 Lars-Erik Larsson
 Rolf Edling

Switzerland
 Denys Chamay
 Peter Lötscher
 Christian Kauter
 Alexandre Bretholz
 Michel Steininger

United States
 Paul Pesthy
 Stephen Netburn
 David Micahnik
 Daniel Cantillon
 Robert Beck

West Germany
 Dieter Jung
 Franz Rompza
 Fritz Zimmermann
 Max Geuter
 Paul Gnaier

Results

Round 1

Pool A

Pool B

Pool C

Pool D

Pool E

Elimination rounds 

 Main bracket

 Consolation

Final ranking

References

Epee team
Men's events at the 1968 Summer Olympics